Coverdale is a civil parish in Albert County, New Brunswick, Canada, located along the Petitcodiac River opposite Moncton and Dieppe. It comprised (before 2023) one incorporated town and one local service district (LSD), both of which were members of the Southeast Regional Service Commission.

The Census subdivision of the same name includes only the unincorporated part of the parish.

Origin of name
The parish takes its name from Coverdale River, a former name of Little River, a tributary of the Petitcodiac.

The Coverdale River may have been named in honour of Myles Coverdale (1488-1569), translator of the Bible and Bishop of Exeter.

History
Coverdale Parish was erected in 1828 from northern Hillsborough Parish.

Boundaries
Coverdale Parish is bounded:
on the north and east by the Petitcodiac River;
on the south the southern line of a grant to Robert Crossman, about 120 metres south of the mouth of Stoney Creek, and its prolongation to the Westmorland County line;
on the west by Westmorland County.

Evolution of boundaries
When Coverdale Parish was erected the western line was a continuation of Hillsborough's western line, with modern Grub Road and Middlesex in Salisbury Parish and the parish line running east of Douthwright Road. The southern line ran west from the mouth of Stoney Creek, slightly north of where it starts today.

Following the erection of Albert County in 1845 the new county line passed through Salisbury and Harvey Parishes. This was found inconvenient and the county line was moved in 1846, adding western Coverdale to the parish.

The parish got its modern boundaries in 1850, when the line with Hillsborough Parish was moved slightly south to its current starting point.

Municipality
The town of Riverview is located opposite Moncton. It was created in 1973 as the town of Coverdale by the forced amalgamation of the villages of (from east to west) Bridgedale, Gunningsville, and Riverview Heights along with parts of Coverdale Parish. The first act of the town council was to change the name to Riverview.

Local service district
The local service district of the parish of Coverdale contains all of the parish outside Riverview; it was established on 23 November 1966 to assess for fire protection and community services & recreational facilities following the abolition of the county councils by the new Municipalities Act. First aid & ambulance services were added on 14 March 1973.

Today the LSD assesses for community & recreation services in addition to the basic LSD services of fire protection, police services, land use planning, emergency measures, and dog control. The taxing authority is 618.00 Coverdale.

Communities
Communities at least partly within the parish; bold indicates an incorporated municipality

Cherryvale
Colpitts Settlement
Coverdale
Grub Road
Lower Coverdale
Lower Turtle Creek
Middlesex
Nixon
Pine Glen
Price
Stoney Creek
Synton
Turtle Creek
Upper Coverdale
Riverview
Bridgedale
Findlay
Gunningsville
Middle Coverdale
Riverview Heights

Bodies of water
Bodies of water at least partly in the parish: italics indicate a name no longer in official use

Bull Creek
Little River (Coverdale River)
Mill Creek
Mud Creek
Petitcodiac River
Turtle Creek

Other notable places
Parks, historic sites, and other noteworthy places in the parish.
 Big Meadows Protected Natural Area

Demographics
Parish population total does not include area within 2021 boundaries of Riverview. Revised census figures based on the 2023 local governance reforms have not been released.

Population

Language
Mother tongue (2016)

Access Routes
Highways and numbered routes that run through the parish, including external routes that start or finish at the parish limits:

Highways

Principal Routes
None

Secondary Routes:

External Routes:
None

See also
List of parishes in New Brunswick

Notes

References

Parishes of Albert County, New Brunswick
Communities in Greater Moncton
Local service districts of Albert County, New Brunswick